The following Union Army units and commanders fought in the Battle of Perryville of the American Civil War. Order of battle compiled from the army organization during the battle and return of casualties. The Confederate order of battle is listed separately.

Abbreviations used

Military rank
 MG = Major General
 BG = Brigadier General
 Col = Colonel
 Ltc = Lieutenant Colonel
 Maj = Major
 Cpt = Captain
 Lt =  1st Lieutenant
 2Lt = 2nd Lieutenant
 Sgt = Sergeant
 Bvt = Brevet

Artillery
 10-pdr Par = 10-pounder Parrott rifle
 12-pdr How = M1841 12-pounder howitzer
 12-pdr Mtn = M1841 mountain howitzer
 12-pdr Nap = M1857 12-pounder Napoleon
 24-pdr How = M1841 24-pounder howitzer
 3" R       = 3-inch Ordnance rifle
 6-pdr SB   = M1841 6-pounder field gun
 Jam R      = James rifle
 How        = howitzer
 pdr        = pound (projectile weight)
 R          = rifled gun
 SB         = smoothbore gun

Other
 w = wounded
 mw = mortally wounded
 k = killed
 c = captured
 m = missing

Army of the Ohio

55,000 men, 147 guns (k-889, w-2966, m-433 = 4,288)

MG Don Carlos Buell, Commanding
MG George Henry Thomas, second in command

Escort:
 Anderson Troop, Pennsylvania Cavalry: 2Lt Thomas S. Maple
 4th US Cavalry (Companies B, C, D, G, I, & K): Ltc James Oakes

Signal detachment: Cpt Jesse Merrill

I Corps

13,000 men, 38 guns (k-695, w-2290, m-346 = 3,331)

MG Alexander McDowell McCook

 Chief of Staff: Ltc James Vote Bomford (w)

II Corps

20,000 men, 65 guns (k-2, w-4, m-6 = 12)

MG Thomas Leonidas Crittenden

Escort:
 1st Michigan Engineers & Mechanics (Companies B, E, I, & K): Col William Power Innes
 1st Ohio Cavalry (4 companies): Maj James Laughlin
 3rd Ohio Cavalry (4 companies): Maj John Howard Foster

III Corps

22,000 men, 44 guns (k-192, w-672, m-80 = 944)

MG Charles Champion Gilbert

See also

 Kentucky in the American Civil War

Notes

References
 Eicher, John H., and Eicher, David J., Civil War High Commands, Stanford University Press, 2001, .
 Holman, Kurt. Perryville Order of Battle: Forces Present at Perryville, October 8, 1862 (Revised January 10, 2008), unpublished paper, Perryville Battlefield State Historic Site.
 Noe, Kenneth W., Perryville: This Grand Havoc of Battle, University Press of Kentucky, 2001, .
 U.S. War Department, The War of the Rebellion: A Compilation of the Official Records of the Union and Confederate Armies, Series I, Volume XVI, Part I and II (Washington, DC:  U.S. Government Printing Office), 1886.

American Civil War orders of battle